Frans Lodewijk Johannis Tutuhatunewa (16 or 26 June 1923 – 22 October 2016) was the fourth president in exile of the Republic of the South Moluccas between 1993 and 2010. He was born in Batavia, Dutch East Indies. He was preceded by Johan Manusama and succeeded by John Wattilete in 2010.

References

1923 births
2016 deaths
Presidents of the Republic of South Maluku
Moluccan independence activists
Indonesian politicians
People from Batavia, Dutch East Indies
Vrije Universiteit Amsterdam alumni